Dorothy Rudd Moore (June 4, 1940 – March 30, 2022) was an American composer and music educator. She was one of the co-founders of the Society of Black Composers. She is considered one of the leading women composers of color for her generation and did commissions for the National Symphony, Opera Ebony, the Buffalo Philharmonic, and solo artists. She was a member of the American Composers Alliance, BMI, New York Singing Teachers Association, and New York Women Composers. Her works were unpublished, but are available through the American Composers Alliance.

Biography
Moore was born in New Castle, Delaware. Her mother was a singer and Moore would make up her own songs as child. Moore knew she wanted to become a composer at a young age and took piano lessons as a child at the Wilmington School of Music, where she studied with Harry Andrews. She learned to play clarinet so that at Howard High she should join the previously all-male band. She was involved with music in other ways including music theory studies, the high school orchestra and choir, and church choir.

Moore started college at Howard University as a music education major but later changed to composition. She studied with Dean Warner Lawson, Thomas Kerr, and Mark Fax, graduating in 1963 with a Bachelor of Music. She received the Lucy Moten Fellowship to study in France where she continued her studies with Nadia Boulanger at the American Conservatory at Fontainebleau in Paris in 1963, Chou Wen-Chung in New York in 1965, and Lola Hayes in 1972.

Moore worked as a private music teacher, from 1965-66 taught at the Harlem School of the Arts, in 1969 at New York University, and in 1971 at the Bronx Community College. She married cellist and conductor, Kermit Moore, in 1964. In 1968, she co-founded the Society of Black Composers in New York City. In 1969, Moore and her husband were almost prevented from performing at the 1969 Damrosch Memorial Concert because "administrators fretted over having not just one but two 'Negroes' on the program."

Moore has received the Lucy Moten fellowship and other grants, and in 1968 became a co-founder of the Society of Black Composers in New York. Her works, Dirge and Deliverance, and Songs from the Dark Tower were released by Performance Records in 1981. In 1985, the world premiere of her opera, Frederick Douglass, took place in New York City by Opera Ebony.

Between 1988 and 1990, she sat on the music panel of the New York State Council of the Arts.

Awards 

 American Music Center Grant, 1972
 New York State Council on the Arts Grant, 1985
 Meet the Composer grants

Works

Style 
According to the American Composers Alliance, Moore's music is "admired for its high level of artistry and its seriousness of purpose." Her song A Little Whimsy (1982) was a response to critics who called her music too serious. Moore theorized that being a singer herself gave her insight into how to write well for voice. She did not consider herself a fast composer and preferred to have a finished product at a premier, unlike other composers who may return to rework their music.
From the Dark Tower (1970) is a song cycle written for Hilda Harris, a mezzo-soprano of critical acclaim in opera. It was later recorded and released by Performance Records. There are eight songs set to poems by black writers including Dream Variation by Langston Hughes and the namesake of the cycle, From the Dark Tower, by Countee Cullen. It is performed by voice, cello, and piano.

Moore's only opera Frederick Douglass premiered on June 28, 1985 at City College of New York with Opera Ebony. The artistic director was Benjamin Matthews with conducting by Warren George Wilson, lighting by Ron Burns, and stage direction by Ward Fleming. Frederick Douglass and his wife were portrayed by James Butler and Hilda Harris. Tim Page called it "not so much an opera as a series of musical meditations on love, death, religion, political oppression and eventual deliverance."

Selected works 
Moore has composed song cycles, chamber pieces, orchestral music, and an opera. Selected works include:
Twelve Quatrains from the Rubaiyat, song cycle, 1962
Symphony No. 1, 1963
Three Pieces for violin and piano, 1967
Modes for string quartet, 1968
Lament for Nine Instruments, 1969
Moods for viola and cello, 1969
Songs from the Dark Tower, song cycle, 1970
Dirge and Deliverance for cello and piano, 1971
Dream and Variations for piano, 1974
Sonnets on Love, Rosebuds, and Death for soprano, violin, and piano, 1975
In Celebration, a collage to poems by Langston Hughes, 1977
A Little Whimsy, piano, 1982
Frederick Douglass, opera, 1985
Transcencion, 1986

References

External links 
 Dorothy Rudd Moore, video interview
 Sonnets on Love, Rosebuds, and Death, video performance
 Interview with Dorothy Rudd Moore, February 10, 1990

1940 births
Living people
20th-century American composers
20th-century classical composers
20th-century women composers
20th-century American women musicians
American women classical composers
American music educators
American women music educators
African-American classical composers
American classical composers
African-American women classical composers
African-American music educators
Bronx Community College faculty
Howard University alumni
New York University faculty
Musicians from Delaware
People from New Castle, Delaware
American women academics
African-American women musicians
20th-century African-American women
20th-century African-American people
20th-century African-American musicians
21st-century African-American people
21st-century African-American women